Nautilus is an Italian publisher based in Turin. Started in 1981, it is linked with Anarchism. One of its most prestigious publications is the translation of the complete collection of the issues of the Situationist International.

External links
Official website

Publishing companies of Italy
Companies based in Turin
Mass media in Turin
Culture in Turin